Elm Creek is a stream in Schuyler County in the U.S. state of Missouri. It is a tributary of the Chariton River.

Elm Creek most likely was so named on account of elm timber near its course.

See also
List of rivers of Missouri

References

Rivers of Schuyler County, Missouri
Rivers of Missouri